Pablo Fernández Santos (born 4 June 1976) is a Spanish politician, procurator in the Cortes of Castile and León and member of Podemos.

Biography 

Born in León, Pablo Fernández graduated in Law from the Complutense University of Madrid. He has been self-employed, running a press kiosk in his hometown.

In 2014 he began his activism in Podemos, being elected representative to the Citizen Council of the party. In February 2015, he was elected as Secretary-General of Podemos in Castile and León by the party's bases, likewise being designated in April as presidential candidate of the Junta of Castile and León and obtaining in the regional elections of May representation of all provinces, except for Soria, in the Cortes of Castile and León.

In May 2017, he was reelected Secretary-General of Podemos-Castile and León.

References 

People from León, Spain
1976 births
Complutense University of Madrid alumni
Podemos (Spanish political party) politicians
Living people
Members of the 9th Cortes of Castile and León
Members of the 10th Cortes of Castile and León
Members of the 11th Cortes of Castile and León